Doornkop Fish and Wildlife Reserve is a nature reserve and game park located near Carolina, Mpumalanga, 3 hours from Johannesburg and 2.5 hours from Pretoria.

Activities in the reserve include fly fishing, walks, birding, tennis, game viewing swimming pool, games room and horse riding.

References

External links

Nature reserves in South Africa